The Russian People's Democratic Union (RNDS; ; Rossiyskiy narodno-demokraticheskiy soyuz, RNDS), initially named as People for Democracy and Justice (NDS; ; Narod za demokratiyu i spravedlivost, NDS) was a liberal opposition political party in Russia, founded in 2006. The party was a member of the opposition coalition The Other Russia and was founded by former Prime Minister Mikhail Kasyanov after he failed to win the leadership of the Democratic Party of Russia. The Union was one of the founding parties of the People's Freedom Party, in which the RNDS merged into in 2012.

See also
Dissenters' March
The Other Russia
United Civil Front
Mikhail Kasyanov
Yabloko

External links
Official site of RNDS
Site Mikhail Kasyanov - leader of RNDS
Community in LJ
2007 establishments in Russia
Alliance of Liberals and Democrats for Europe Party member parties
Liberal parties in Russia
Opposition to Vladimir Putin
People's Freedom Party "For Russia without Lawlessness and Corruption"
Political parties established in 2007
People's Freedom Party
Russian democracy movements